"Welcome to the Party" is a song by American music producer Diplo, Moroccan-American rapper French Montana and Colombian-American rapper Lil Pump, featuring guest vocals from American singer Zhavia Ward. Written by Montana, Pump, Jocelyn Donald and its producers Diplo and Valentino Khan, it was released by Columbia Records on May 15, 2018, as the second single from the soundtrack to the film Deadpool 2 (2018).

Background
Montana spoke of the collaboration during an interview on Beats 1: "You know Diplo, he's one of the best at what he do, and it just so happened that he had this beat that he was working on. And me and Lil Pump had us doing the 'Gucci Gang' remix and he played it for me and the way everything came together it was just magic."

Composition
"Welcome to the Party" is an uptempo trap song, which sees Diplo returning to the pre-dubstep era of EDM for the production. It bears a resemblance to TNGHT's song "R U Ready", which was sampled by Kanye West on his 2013 song "Blood on the Leaves". Lyrically, Montana compares the size of his cash flow to human behemoth and NBA player Shaquille O'Neal in the opening verse. Pump raps about his newfound luxurious lifestyle and money spending habits.

Music video
An animated video released on the same day as the song shows an animated version of Deadpool performing popular dance crazes including twerking, BlocBoy JB's "shoot" dance and flossing in front of a blue-gray backdrop. The animation was also included in a Snapchat lens which can be activated by selecting Deadpool's logo.

The official music video, directed by Jason Koenig, was released on May 21, 2018, and features the four artists partying and taking part in havoc and destruction interspersed with clips from the movie.

Remixes
A remix by American DJ Valentino Khan was released on July 4, 2018.  A second remix featuring American rappers Juicy J and Famous Dex was released on July 27, 2018.

Personnel
Credits adapted from Tidal.
 Diplo – production, drums
 Valentino Khan – production, mix engineering, master engineering, drums, horn
 Maximillian Jaeger – drums, horn, record engineering
 Sebastian "Diablo" Deleon – record engineering
 Baruch "Mixx" Nembhard – record engineering

Charts

Certifications

Release history

References

External links
 

2018 singles
2018 songs
Deadpool (film series)
Dubstep songs
Epic Records singles
French Montana songs
Lil Pump songs
Song recordings produced by Diplo
Songs written by Diplo
Songs written by French Montana
Songs written by Lil Pump
Songs written for films
Trap music (EDM) songs
Warner Records singles
Zhavia Ward songs